Cryptomastix mullani  is a species of air-breathing land snail, a terrestrial pulmonate gastropod mollusk in the family Polygyridae.

Subspecies 
Cryptomastix mullani blandi (Hemphill, 1892)
Cryptomastix mullani clappi (Hemphill, 1897)
Cryptomastix mullani hemphilli (W. G. Binney, 1886)
Cryptomastix mullani latilabris (Pilsbry, 1940)
Cryptomastix mullani olneyae (Pilsbry, 1891)
Cryptomastix mullani tuckeri (Pilsbry and Henderson, 1930)

References

Polygyridae
Gastropods described in 1861
Taxa named by James Graham Cooper